Brigitte Häberli-Koller (born 23 August 1958) is a Swiss politician of the party The Centre (DM, CVP until 2021). She is a former member of the National Council and a current of the Council of States of which she was elected its president in November 2022.

Early life and education 
Brigitte Häberli was born in August 1958 in Wetzikon, Canton of Zürich but has her place of origin in Münchenbuchsee in Canton of Bern. After she completed her apprenticeship as a merchant, she worked for some time in Zurich.

Political career 
She joined The Centre in In 1996 she became a member of the Executive Council of Bichelsee-Balterswil, the same year she was also elected into the Grand Council of Thurgau representing CVP. She worked for both political offices until 2003. In the Federal Elections of 2003, she was elected into the National Council by a margin of sixteen votes, representing the CVP for Thurgau. In 2005, she was discussed as possible president of CVP, but then declined.  2011 she was a member of the National Council. In the Federal Elections of 2011 she was elected into the Council of States. She was the first women to represent the Canton of Thurgau in the Council of States. In November 2022 she was elected as the president of the Council of States. Élisabeth Baume-Schneider of the Social Democratic Party (SP) and Lisa Mazzone of the Green Party (GP) will assume the first and second Vice-Presidencies, therefore making it the first Council of States presided by three women.

Presidency of Council of States 
In her inaugurating speech, Brigitte Häberli-Koller appealed to the political instrument of a direct democracy, which would allow the Swiss population to remain honest.

Personal life 
Brigitte Häberli-Koller is married and the mother of three children. Her political career is celebrated in her municipality and after her election to the presidency of the Council of States she was granted an honorary citizenship of Bichelsee-Balterswil. She lives in Bichelsee with her husband.

References 

1958 births
Living people
21st-century Swiss women politicians
The Centre politicians
People from Wetzikon
Presidents of the Council of States (Switzerland)